La Saga, Negocio de Familia (in English The Saga; Family business) was a popular Colombian Soup Opera ("telenovela" in Spanish) aired in 2004 By Caracol TV and currently airing (starting in 2006) on GenTV in South Florida. The show follows the history of the Manrique family, which was prominent in the underworld of Bogotá, Colombia. This telenovela is characterized by an unconventional plot; it is not a love story, but several stories of events that occur through five generations of the same family. Moreover, in this production there is no humor and the plot is marked by death, suffering and crime.

It received the "Best Telenovela" award at the Colombian Television Awards in 2005.

Plot

1930: Exile
This is the story of the Manrique, a provincial family that moved to Bogotá after one of its patriarchs decided to try his luck in the city. He ended up founding a criminal organization by accident and decided to strengthen it. Then, he tried to reintegrate into society but tragically succumbed after having created an illegal world.

The decade of the 30s brought a radical, violent, and armed political conflict to the country. Tomás Manrique, a man of class and wealthy family, had to flee his home town with his wife Josefina and his son Pedrito. During the night, an armed group unexpectedly barges into a party, killing every male they found to be in the opposing political party. When this war that Tomás had decided not to be a part of had begun, he moves to the capital with his family helped by a worker from the railway station.  The worker, Pascual Martinez, leads them to a small inn owned by Magnolia, a woman dedicated to witchcraft. However, Pascual, in complicity with Magnolia, breaks into the family's room and steals their money, after Pascual decides he can be cheated. When Tomás confronts him, he is brutally beaten, but when he recovers from his wounds, Tomás takes revenge by stealing Pascual's gold cuff links from his room. Later, both men settle their differences and go to a brothel owned by Deborah, Pascual's lover. The brothel becomes a haunt for both of them. Helped by Pascual, Tomás accepts a job in a factory that manufactures screws.

One afternoon, a group of thieves enters the factory. Tomás accidentally ends up being the hero when he immobilizes the criminals, winning the respect and trust of his boss Facundo, who allows Tomás, dandy by nature, to enter and desire his wealthy lifestyle, full of luxury and commodity. But Tomás knows that collecting such a fortune means many years of hard work, and he is not willing to wait that long. He decides to rob his boss's house with the complicity of Pascual, a thief and new friend. In order to get the guns for this, they made a deal with a mobster who, in return, asks for part of the loot and takes Pedro, Tomás's son, as a guarantee. Tomás accepts the deal, but things get complicated, and he ends up accidentally killing his boss and also later killing the mobster who lent them the guns, thereby not sharing any of the loot. He rescues his son and gets home with a feeling of having done the right thing.

This marks the beginning of a world of crime in the life of Tomás, and little by little, the Manriques rise to the point of a stable income and well-being through legal and illegal businesses. Tomás's dream of becoming a well-established, honest businessman and gentleman never come true, and he slowly resigns himself to work in the underworld.
 
1940s: The Legacy

Ten years later, Pedro has become 20. Pedro falls in love with the daughter of the man who killed the men of his village. Pedro plays poker with the man and with help from Pasqual he gets all of the man's money. His daughter hated Pedro when she found out that her father lost the money she made a deal. The deal was if she could beat him she would get the money back for her father. If she lost she would have sex with him. He almost lost but, wins he tells her he is better than that and that if she wants him to condone her father's debt she has to marry him. Which she accepts.

Cast
 Robinson Díaz as Tomás Manrique (Ernesto Enríquez)
 Diego Cadavid as Pedro Manrique Zárate (joven)/Manuel Manrique Guzmán (joven)/Óscar Manrique Angarita
 Cristian Santos as Pedro Manrique Zárate (niño)
 Katherine Vélez as Josefina Zárate de Manrique
 Flora Martínez as Marlén Romero de Manrique (joven)
 María Helena Doering as Marlén Romero de Manrique
 Frank Ramírez as Pedro Manrique Zárate (Rosendo Enríquez)/Manuel Manrique Guzmán
 Juan Carlos Vargas as Armando Manrique Romero (Francisco Enríquez)/Iván Manrique Zapata
 Luis Fernando Bohórquez as Antonio Manrique Romero (Hermilio Enríquez)
 Isabella Santodomingo as Ana María Guzmán de Manrique
 Sandra Reyes as Pilar de Manrique
 Jonathan Herrera as Manuel Manrique (niño)
 Germán Daniel Villegas as Tito Manrique (niño)
 Nicolás Rincón as Tito Manrique Guzmán (joven)
 Jairo Camargo as Tito Manrique Guzmán
 Sebastián Peñuela as Ernesto Manrique (niño)
 Manuel José Chávez as Ernesto Manrique (joven)
 Ronald Ayazo as Ernesto Manrique   
 Catalina Aristizábal as Clemencia Angarita de Manrique (joven)
 Ana Bolena Meza as Clemencia Angarita de Manrique
 Martina García as Helena Angarita de Manrique (joven)
 Patricia Ércole as Helena Angarita de Manrique
 Adriana Romero as Lucrecia Zapata (joven)
 Judy Henríquez as Lucrecia Zapata
 Liliana González de la Torre as Inés Manrique Angarita
 Manuela González as Estela Manrique Angarita
 Estefanía Borge as Claudia Manrique Angarita
 Adriana Arango as Carmenza "Candy" López de Zapata/"Candelaria González"
 Edgardo Román as Ananías Romero "El Capi"
 Marlon Moreno as Pascual Martínez
 Vicky Hernández as Magnolia
 Maribel Abello as Déborah/Lola
 Herbert King as "Kit" Romano Valdés
 Liliana Salazar (actriz colombiana) as Grecia
 Andrés Felipe Martínez as Augusto Faryala
 Carlos Serrato as Roberto Romero/Faryala Jr.
 Juan Pablo Barragán as Elkin
 Fernando Arango as Agente Niño
 Germán Quintero as Tiberio Angarita/Humberto Angarita (Federico Raldes)
 Gilberto Ramírez as Tarcisio
 Humberto Arango as Fernando Benítez
 Fernando Arévalo as Casimiro Ruiz/Facundo López
 Juan Pablo Franco as Héctor Ruiz
 Alejandro Martínez as Felipe "Pipe" Ruiz
 Alejandra Miranda as Hortensia de Ruiz
 Patricia Bermúdez as Carolina Ruiz
 Adriana Ricardo as Andrea Jiménez de Ruiz
 Luis Fernando Múnera as Federico Muñoz
 Consuelo Moure as Amparo de Muñoz
 Luigi Aycardi as Omar Muñoz
 Élmer Valenzuela - Mauricio Muñoz
 Sandra Pérez as Paola Muñoz
 Carlos Barbosa Romero as John Jairo "J.J." Garrido
 Andre Bauth as Enrique
 Álvaro Bayona as Cominito Pérez
 Fernando Solórzano as Aquilino Camargo/"Chicanero" Arzuaga
 Felipe Calero as Pirro Camargo
 Andrea López as Alexa
 Pilar Cárdenas as Gilma
 Marco Antonio López as José Gaitán
 Húgo Armando Aguilera as Roberto Márquez
 Saín Castro as Teniente/Capitán Motta
 Carlos Cifuentes as Doctor Leididi
 David Osorio as Raúl Benítez, recepcionista hotel
 Harold Córdoba as Osvaldo Tovar
 Fernando Corredor as Antuco
 Samara de Córdova as Lilia/Maruja
 Juan Carlos Delgado as Lucho
 Jenny Díaz as Margarita
 Jimmy Vázquez as José Leonardo Vargas
 Mario Duarte as Jaime Angulo
 Alexandra Restrepo as Ginger
 Jorge Herrera as José María Manosalva
 Patricia Vásquez as Herlinda Zapata
 Carolina Cuervo as Yolanda
 John Mario Rivera as Teniente Julián Santamaría
 Sergio González as Rigoleto Castro
 Yuly Ferreira as Marieta Castro
 Diego Giraldo as Genaro
 Armando Gutiérrez as Teófilo Cruz
 Ignacio Hijuelos as Alfredo
 Andrés Huertas as Padre Huertas
 Franky Linero as Abogado Julio Miranda
 Jorge Mantilla as Suárez
 Kike Mendoza as Víctor González/Rodríguez, "Pochola"
 Ramiro Meneses as El Chiqui
 Luis Mesa as Daniel Ochoa
 Wilson Buitrago as Rómulo Almanza
 Margoth Velásquez as Teodolinda
 Álvaro Barrera as Teniente Leopoldo Cárdenas
 Víctor Hugo Ruiz as Carlos Baquero
 David Osorio as Cabo/Teniente Muñoz
 Juan Carlos Arango as Gerardo
 Aura Helena Prada as Betty
 José Manuel Ospina as Álvarez
 Lady Noriega as Natasha
 Guillermo Olarte as Teniente Robles
 Harold Palacios as Arteaga
 July Pedraza as Mariela
 Claude Pimont as Marcel Dumond
 Luis Fernando Potes as Jiménez
 Alfonso Rojas as Carabina
 Marcela Angarita as Lina
 Alejandra Sandoval as Teresa Galindo
 Jairo Sedano as Anastasio
 Paola Suárez as Lupita
 Patricia Castañeda as Patricia Angarita
 Evelyn Santos as Gilma Ortega, "Gigi"
 Rafael Cardoso as López
 Luis Fernando Salas as "Quique"
 Rodrigo Rodríguez as "El Apache"
 Jorge Pérez as Lucio Benítez
 Guillermo Gálvez as Julio Ortiz
 Lucho Velasco as Camilo Cruz, "El Pereza"
 Alicia de Rojas as Doña Virgelina
 Fernando Peñuela as Ever Murillo
 Elkin Díaz as Nieto de 'Chicanero' Arzuaga
 Marcela Carvajal as Marina Guzmán
 Juan Carlos Pérez Almanza as Efraín/Manteca

References

Spanish-language telenovelas
Colombian telenovelas
Caracol Televisión telenovelas
2004 telenovelas
2004 Colombian television series debuts
2005 Colombian television series endings
Television shows set in Bogotá